Cechenena pollux is a moth of the  family Sphingidae.

Distribution 
It is known from Indonesia (Java).

Description 
It is similar to green forms of Cechenena lineosa but the median band of the hindwing upperside is yellow. The forewing ground colour ranges from rust-brown to green.

References

Cechenena
Moths described in 1875